Klára Fried-Bánfalvi (9 May 1931 – 15 July 2009) was a Hungarian sprint canoeist who competed from the late 1940s to the early 1960s.

Competing in two Summer Olympics, she won a bronze medal in the K-2 500 m event at Rome in 1960. Fried-Bánfalvi also won a gold medal in the K-2 500 m event at the 1954 ICF Canoe Sprint World Championships in Mâcon.

She was Jewish.

See also
List of select Jewish canoeists

References

External links

Klára Fried-Bánfalvi's profile at the Hungarian Olympic Committee 

1931 births
2009 deaths
Canoeists at the 1948 Summer Olympics
Canoeists at the 1960 Summer Olympics
Hungarian female canoeists
Olympic canoeists of Hungary
Olympic bronze medalists for Hungary
Olympic medalists in canoeing
Jewish Hungarian sportspeople
ICF Canoe Sprint World Championships medalists in kayak
Medalists at the 1960 Summer Olympics